In situ (often not italicized in English) is a Latin phrase that translates literally to "on site" or "in position." It can mean "locally", "on site", "on the premises", or "in place" to describe where an event takes place and is used in many different contexts. For example, in fields such as physics, geology, chemistry, or biology, in situ may describe the way a measurement is taken, that is, in the same place the phenomenon is occurring without isolating it from other systems or altering the original conditions of the test. The opposite of in situ is ex situ.

Aerospace
In the aerospace industry, equipment on-board aircraft must be tested in situ, or in place, to confirm everything functions properly as a system. Individually, each piece may work but interference from nearby equipment may create unanticipated problems. Special test equipment is available for this in situ testing. It can also refer to repairs made to the aircraft structure or flight controls while still in place.

Archaeology

In archaeology, in situ refers to an artifact that has not been moved from its original place of deposition. In other words, it is stationary, meaning "still." An artifact being in situ is critical to the interpretation of that artifact and, consequently, of the culture which formed it. Once an artifact's 'find-site' has been recorded, the artifact can then be moved for conservation, further interpretation and display. An artifact that is not discovered in situ is considered out of context and as not providing an accurate picture of the associated culture. However, the out-of-context artifact can provide scientists with an example of types and locations of in situ artifacts yet to be discovered. When excavating a burial site or surface deposit "in situ" refers to cataloging, recording, mapping, photographing human remains in the position they are discovered.

The label in situ indicates only that the object has not been "newly" moved. Thus, an archaeological in situ find may be an object that was historically looted from another place, an item of "booty" of a past war, a traded item, or otherwise of foreign origin. Consequently, the in situ find site may still not reveal its provenance, but with further detective work may help uncover links that otherwise would remain unknown. It is also possible for archaeological layers to be reworked on purpose or by accident (by humans, natural forces or animals). For example, in a Tell mound, where layers are not typically uniform or horizontal, or in land cleared or tilled for farming.

The term in situ is often used to describe ancient sculpture that was carved in place such as the Sphinx or Petra. This distinguishes it from statues that were carved and moved like the Colossi of Memnon, which was moved in ancient times.

Art
In art, in situ refers to a work of art made specifically for a host site, or that a work of art takes into account the site in which it is installed or exhibited. For a more detailed account see: Site-specific art. The term can also refer to a work of art created at the site where it is to be displayed, rather than one created in the artist's studio and then installed elsewhere (e.g., a sculpture carved in situ). In architectural sculpture the term is frequently employed to describe sculpture that is carved on a building, frequently from scaffolds, after the building has been erected.
Also commonly used to describe the site specific dance festival "Insitu". Held in Queens, New York.

Astronomy
A fraction of the globular star clusters in our galaxy, as well as those in other massive galaxies, might have formed in situ. The rest might have been accreted from now-defunct dwarf galaxies.

In astronomy, in situ also refers to in situ planet formation, in which planets are hypothesized to have formed at the orbital distance they are currently observed
rather than to have migrated from a different orbit (referred to as ex situ formation).

Biology and biomedical engineering

In biology and biomedical engineering, in situ means to examine the phenomenon exactly in place where it occurs (i.e., without moving it to some special medium).

In the case of observations or photographs of living animals, it means that the organism was observed (and photographed) in the wild, exactly as it was found and exactly where it was found. This means it was not taken out of the area. The organism had not been moved to another (perhaps more convenient) location such as an aquarium.

This phrase in situ when used in laboratory science such as cell science can mean something intermediate between in vivo and in vitro. For example, examining a cell within a whole organ intact and under perfusion may be in situ investigation. This would not be in vivo as the donor is sacrificed by experimentation, but it would not be the same as working with the cell alone (a common scenario for in vitro experiments).

In vitro was among the first attempts to qualitatively and quantitatively analyze natural occurrences in the lab. Eventually, the limitation of in vitro experimentation was that they were not conducted in natural environments. To compensate for this problem, in vivo experimentation allowed testing to occur in the original organism or environment. To bridge the dichotomy of benefits associated with both methodologies, in situ experimentation allowed the controlled aspects of in vitro to become coalesced with the natural environmental compositions of in vivo experimentation.

In conservation of genetic resources, "in situ conservation" (also "on-site conservation") is the process of protecting an endangered plant or animal species in its natural habitat, as opposed to ex situ conservation (also "off-site conservation").

Chemistry and chemical engineering
In chemistry, in situ typically means "in the reaction mixture."

There are numerous situations in which chemical intermediates are synthesized in situ in various processes. This may be done because the species is unstable, and cannot be isolated, or simply out of convenience. Examples of the former include the Corey-Chaykovsky reagent and adrenochrome.

In biomedical engineering, protein nanogels made by the in situ polymerization method provide a versatile platform for storage and release of therapeutic proteins. It has tremendous applications for cancer treatment, vaccination, diagnosis, regenerative medicine, and therapies for loss-of-function genetic diseases.

In chemical engineering, in situ often refers to industrial plant "operations or procedures that are performed in place." For example, aged catalysts in industrial reactors may be regenerated in place (in situ) without being removed from the reactors.

Civil engineering
In architecture and building, in situ refers to construction which is carried out at the building site using raw materials. Compare that with prefabricated construction, in which building components are made in a factory and then transported to the building site for assembly. For example, concrete slabs may be in situ (also "cast-in-place") or prefabricated.

In situ techniques are often more labor-intensive, and take longer, but the materials are cheaper, and the work is versatile and adaptable. Prefabricated techniques are usually much quicker, therefore saving money on labour costs, but factory-made parts can be expensive. They are also inflexible, and must often be designed on a grid, with all details fully calculated in advance. Finished units may require special handling due to excessive dimensions.

The phrase may also refer to those assets which are present at or near a project site. In this case, it is used to designate the state of an unmodified sample taken from a given stockpile.

Site construction usually involves grading the existing soil surface so that material is "cut" out of one area and "filled" in another area creating a flat pad on an existing slope. The term "in situ" distinguishes soil still in its existing condition from soil modified (filled) during construction. The differences in the soil properties for supporting building loads, accepting underground utilities, and infiltrating water persist indefinitely.

Computer science
. For example, a file backup may be restored over a running system, without needing to take the system down to perform the restore. In the context of a database, a restore would allow the database system to continue to be available to users while a restore happened. An in situ upgrade would allow an operating system, firmware or application to be upgraded while the system was still running, perhaps without the need to reboot it, depending on the sophistication of the system.

Another use of the term in-situ that appears in Computer Science focuses primarily on the use of technology and user interfaces to provide continuous access to situationally relevant information in various locations and contexts. Examples include athletes viewing biometric data on smartwatches to improve their performance, a presenter looking at tips on a smart glass to reduce their speaking rate during a speech, or technicians receiving online and stepwise instructions for repairing an engine.

An algorithm is said to be an in situ algorithm, or in-place algorithm, if the extra amount of memory required to execute the algorithm is O(1), that is, does not exceed a constant no matter how large the input ---except for space for recursive calls on the "call stack." Typically such an algorithm operates on data objects directly in place rather than making copies of them.

For example, heapsort is an in situ sorting algorithm, which sorts the elements of an array in place. Quicksort is an in situ sorting algorithm, but in the worst case it requires linear space on the call stack (this can be reduced to log space). Merge sort is generally not written as an in situ algorithm.

In designing user interfaces, for example, if a word processor displays an image and allows the image to be edited without launching a separate image editor, this is called in situ editing.

AJAX partial page data updates is another example of in situ in a Web UI/UX context. Web 2.0 included AJAX and the concept of asynchronous requests to servers to replace a portion of a web page with new data, without reloading
the entire page, as the early HTML model dictated. Arguably, all asynchronous data transfers or any background task is in situ as the normal state is normally unaware of background tasks, usually notified on completion
by a callback mechanism.

With big data, in situ data would mean bringing the computation to where data is located, rather than the other way like in traditional RDBMS systems where data is moved to computational space. This is also known as in-situ processing.

Design and advertising
In design and advertising the term typically means the superimposing of theoretical design elements onto photographs of real world locations. This is a pre-visualization tool to aid in illustrating a proof of concept.

Earth and atmospheric sciences
In physical geography and the Earth sciences, in situ typically describes natural material or processes prior to transport. For example, in situ is used in relation to the distinction between weathering and erosion, the difference being that erosion requires a transport medium (such as wind, ice, or water), whereas weathering occurs in situ. Geochemical processes are also often described as occurring to material in situ.

 In the atmospheric sciences, in situ refers to obtained through direct contact with the respective subject, such as a radiosonde measuring a parcel of air or an anemometer measuring wind, as opposed to remote sensing such as weather radar or satellites.

Economics
In economics, in situ is used when referring to the in place storage of a product, usually a natural resource. More generally, it refers to any situation where there is no out-of-pocket cost to store the product so that the only storage cost is the opportunity cost of waiting longer to get your money when the product is eventually sold. Examples of in situ storage would be oil and gas wells, all types of mineral and gem mines, stone quarries, timber that has reached an age where it could be harvested, and agricultural products that do not need a physical storage facility such as hay.

Electrochemistry
In electrochemistry, the phrase in situ refers to performing electrochemical experiments under operating conditions of the electrochemical cell, i.e., under potential control. This is opposed to doing ex situ experiments that are performed under the absence of potential control. Potential control preserves the electrochemical environment essential to maintain the double layer structure intact and the electron transfer reactions occurring at that particular potential in the electrode/electrolyte interphasial region.

Environmental remediation
In situ can refer to where a clean up or remediation of a polluted site is performed using and stimulating the natural processes in the soil, contrary to ex situ where contaminated soil is excavated and cleaned elsewhere, off site.

Experimental physics
In experimental physics in situ typically refers to a method of data collection or manipulation of a sample without exposure to an external environment. For example, the Si(111) 7x7 surface reconstruction is visible using a scanning tunneling microscope when it is prepared and analyzed in situ.

Experimental psychology
In psychology experiments, in situ typically refers to those experiments done in a field setting as opposed to a laboratory setting.

Gastronomy
In gastronomy, "in situ" refers to the art of cooking with the different resources that are available at the site of the event. Here a person is not going to the restaurant, but the restaurant comes to the person's home.

Law
In legal contexts, in situ is often used for its literal meaning. For example, in Hong Kong, "in situ land exchange" involves the government exchanging the original or expired lease of a piece of land with a new grant or re-grant with the same piece of land or a portion of that.

In the field of recognition of governments under public international law the term in situ is used to distinguish between an exiled government and a government with effective control over the territory, i.e. the government in situ.

Linguistics
In linguistics, specifically syntax, an element may be said to be in situ if it is pronounced in the position where it is interpreted. For example, questions in languages such as Chinese have in situ wh-elements, with structures comparable to "John bought what?" with what in the same position in the sentence as the grammatical object would be in its affirmative counterpart (for example, "John bought bread"). An example of an English wh-element that is not in situ (see wh-movement): "What did John buy?"

Literature
In literature in situ is used to describe a condition. The Rosetta Stone, for example, was originally erected in a courtyard, for public viewing. Most pictures of the famous stone are not in situ pictures of it erected, as it would have been originally. The stone was uncovered as part of building material, within a wall. Its in situ condition today is that it is erected, vertically, on public display at the British Museum in London, England.

Medicine

In cancer/oncology: in situ means that malignant cells are present as a tumor but have not metastasized, or invaded beyond the layer or tissue type where it arose. This can happen anywhere in the body, such as the skin, breast tissue, or lung. For example, a cancer of epithelial origin with such features is called carcinoma in situ, and is defined as not having invaded beyond the basement membrane.

This type of tumor can often, depending on where it is located, be removed by surgery.

In anatomy: in situ refers to viewing structures as they appear in normal healthy bodies. For example, one can open up a cadaver's abdominal cavity and view the liver in situ or one can look at an isolated liver that has been removed from the cadaver's body.

In nursing, "in situ" describes any devices or appliances on the patient's body that remain in their desired and optimal position.

In medical simulation, "in situ" refers to the practice of clinical professionals using high fidelity patient simulators to train for clinical practice in patient care environments, such as wards, operating rooms, and other settings, rather than in dedicated simulation training facilities.

In biomedical, protein nanogels made by the in situ polymerization method provide a versatile platform for storage and release of therapeutic proteins. It has tremendous applications for cancer treatment, vaccination, diagnosis, regenerative medicine, and therapies for loss-of-function genetic diseases.

Mining
In situ leaching or in situ recovery refers to the mining technique of injecting lixiviant underground to dissolve ore and bringing the pregnant leach solution to surface for extraction.  Commonly used in uranium mining but has also been used for copper mining.

Petroleum production
In situ refers to recovery techniques which apply heat or solvents to heavy crude oil or bitumen reservoirs beneath the earth's crust. There are several varieties of in situ techniques, but the ones which work best in the oil sands use heat (steam).

The most common type of in situ petroleum production is referred to as SAGD (steam-assisted gravity drainage) this is becoming very popular in the Alberta Oil Sands.

RF transmission
In radio frequency (RF) transmission systems, in situ is often used to describe the location of various components while the system is in its standard transmission mode, rather than operation in a test mode. For example, if an in situ wattmeter is used in a commercial broadcast transmission system, the wattmeter can accurately measure power while the station is "on air."

Space-related
Future space exploration or terraforming may rely on obtaining supplies in situ, such as previous plans to power the Orion space vehicle with fuel minable on the moon. The Mars Direct mission concept is based primarily on the in situ fuel production using Sabatier reaction.

In the space sciences, in situ refers to measurements of the particle and field environment that the satellite is embedded in, such as the detection of energetic particles in the solar wind, or magnetic field measurements from a magnetometer.

Urban planning
In urban planning, in-situ upgrading is an approach to and method of upgrading informal settlements.

Vacuum technology
In vacuum technology, in situ baking refers to heating parts of the vacuum system while they are under vacuum in order to drive off volatile substances that may be absorbed or adsorbed on the walls so they cannot cause outgassing.

Road assistance 
The term in situ, used as "repair in situ," means to repair a vehicle at the place where it has a breakdown.

See also

 carcinoma in situ
 ex vivo
 in silico
 in utero
 in vitro
 in vivo
 In situ conservation
 Ex situ conservation
 List of colossal sculpture in situ
 List of Latin phrases

References

Latin words and phrases
Latin legal terminology
Latin biological phrases
Animal test conditions
Scientific terminology